Gisela Beker (born 9 October 1932 in Free City of Danzig) was an artist and painter. She had three sons; Erol, Brian, and Gary and a granddaughter, Molly. Queen Fabiola of Belgium promoted the first Visual International Art Exhibition of 122 artists from around the world. Beker's painting Graduation Orange received the top prize.

Beker was a US citizen from 1961. She died in Daytona Beach, FL on 18 April 2015, at the age of 82.

See also
 List of German painters

References
 1974 "Apollo Defenseur des Art," Belgium. Gisela Beker Winner of Palme d'Or Painting: Graduation Orange
 1975 Book by Art Critique VALLOBRA, Titled: L'ART CONTEMPORAIN et L'ART FANTASTIQUE, Le Palme d'Or Winner Gisela Beker Painting: Graduation Orange

1932 births
Danzig emigrants to the United States
Living people
20th-century German painters
21st-century German painters
German women painters
Artists from Gdańsk
20th-century American painters
21st-century American painters
People from the Free City of Danzig
20th-century American women artists
21st-century American women artists
American women painters
20th-century German women
21st-century German women